Sar Tang-e Bid Gijeh (also Romanized as Sar Tang-e Bīd Gījeh; also known as Sar Tang) is a village in Qaedrahmat Rural District, Zagheh District, Khorramabad County, Lorestan Province, Iran. At the 2006 census, its population was 25, in 4 families.

References 

Towns and villages in Khorramabad County